Only the Generals Gon Understand is the second EP by American hip hop recording artist Kevin Gates.

Chart performance

Only the Generals Gon Understand debuted at number eighteen on the Billboard 200. It also debuted at number ten and number nine on the Billboard R&B/Hip Hop Albums and the Billboars Top Rap Albums charts, respectively.

Track listing

Charts

References

2019 EPs
Kevin Gates albums